Cidade Dormitório is a Brazilian rock band formed in 2015 in the state of Sergipe.

History 
The band was born of jam sessions in the suburbs of Aracaju (mainly São Cristóvão, at the campus of Federal University of Sergipe). The first inception had Yves Deluc on vocals and guitar, Heder Nascimento on guitar, Lauro Francis on bass and Fabio Aricawa on drums. The three former met after Deluc published some compositions on SoundCloud and was found by the others. As for Aricawa, he was casually discovered by Deluc when he was performing with a Pixies cover band. The members lived in Nossa Senhora do Socorro, a commuter town near Aracaju; hence the band's name, which means commuter town in Portuguese.

In 2015, they released their first single "Barbosa". Later, they took part in Festival DuSol and, in 2017 (on 31 January), they released their debut EP Esperando o Pior, via Banana Records and which song "Setas Azuis" received airplay in Argentina.

On 28 October 2019, they released their debut album Fraternidade-Terror. It was preceded by two singles released in the same year ("Relacionamentos são extremamente complicados e meu cachorro sabe disso" and "Homo Erectus Plus").

On 10 July 2020, they released Verões e Eletrodomésticos, a remix album with tracks from Fraternidade-Terror and Esperando o Pior.

Members 
Sources:

Current line-up 
 Yves Deluc — vocals, guitar
 Fabio Aricawa — backing vocals, drums
 Lauro Francis — bass

Former members 
 João Mario — guitar
 Heder Nascimento — guitar

Session members 
 Alexandre Mesquita — drums (2017)

Discography

EPs 
 Esperando o Pior (2017)

Albums 
 Fraternidade-Terror (2019)
 Verões e Eletrodomésticos (2020)

Singles 
 "Barbosa" (2015)
 "Relacionamentos são extremamente complicados e meu cachorro sabe disso" (2019)
 "Homo Erectus Plus" (2019)

References 

Musical trios
Musical groups established in 2015
Aracaju
Brazilian post-punk music groups
Brazilian alternative rock groups
2015 establishments in Brazil
Brazilian psychedelic rock music groups